Fisher is a rural municipality in the province of Manitoba in Western Canada.

Communities
Broad Valley
Fisher Branch
Fisherton
Hodgson
Poplarfield
Sylvan
Zbaraz

Demographics 

References 

 Manitoba Municipalities: Rural Municipality of Fisher
 Map of Fisher R.M. at Statcan

External links
 

Fisher